The LNFA 2015 season was the 21st season of American football in Spain. Badalona Dracs were the defending champions, but lost to Valencia Firebats in the final.

Teams were divided into three categories, named Serie A, B and C, with promotion and relegation between them.

LNFA Serie A

Six teams entered the LNFA Serie A, the top-tier level of American football in Spain. L'Hospitalet Pioners, Rivas Osos, Valencia Firebats, Valencia Giants and Badalona Dracs repeated from last year. Mallorca Voltors were promoted from last year LNFA Serie B.

Valencia Firebats won their fourth title. Mallorca Voltors and L'Hospitalet Pioners were relegated.

Regular season

Playoffs

Promotion/relegation playoffs
The fifth placed team in Serie A, L'Hospitalet Pioners, played Serie B runner-up, Barberà Rookies. Rookies won the game and will play in next year Serie A.

|}

LNFA Serie B

Ten teams played the Serie B in 2015. Gijón Mariners and Cantabria Bisons resigned to play in the league, due to the new competition format with longer travels.

The two group winners joined directly the semifinals while the second and the third qualified teams played the quarterfinal round.

The worst qualified team was directly relegated to Serie C while the second worst one played a game against the Serie C runner-up to remain in the league.

Group Odd

Group Even

Promotion playoffs

LNFA Serie C
The new Serie C was composed by the Regional and interregional leagues. The top 8 teams could qualify to the promotion playoffs, but finally only six teams signed up for the playoffs.

Andalusian League

Catalan League

Central Conference

An extra gameday was played to reach the required minimum of six games to compete in the playoffs for promotion. The results of the extra game were:
Arganda Toros 18–6 Alcorcón Smilodons
Majadahonda Wildcats 26–7 Tres Cantos Jabatos
ANV Cuervos 13–6 Guadalajara Stings

Eastern Conference

Northern League

Playoffs
The top 8 teams could qualify to the promotion playoffs, but finally only six teams signed up for these. The champion of the Serie C will promote directly to Serie B, while the runner-up must play one more game against a Serie B team.

Granada Lions and Santurtzi Coyotes can not qualify for the playoffs, as they also play Serie B.

Tiebreakers
The six teams are ranked based on these criteria:
higher percentage of wins
lower average of points allowed
superior point difference average
lower average of players sent off
lucky draw

Ranking

Bracket

Promotion/relegation playoff

|}

References

External links
FEFA American Football Spanish Federation
Results and information of Spanish leagues

Liga Nacional de Fútbol Americano
2015 in Spanish sport
2015 in American football